Tadeusz Trzmiel (born 1945) is the Polish politician who served as Deputy Mayor of Kraków between 2002 and 2018, under Mayor Jacek Majchrowski.

References

1945 births
Polish politicians
Living people